The 2010 season will be the South Wales Scorpions first season of professional rugby league, after they were formed in 2009.

Friendlies 
South Wales vs Wigan Warriors- cancelled

South Wales Scorpions 82-18 South Wales Thunder

2010 Championship 1

Round 1
South Wales 22-20 Workington Town

References 

South Wales Scorpions seasons
S
2010 in Welsh rugby league